Michael Whelan is an American artist and illustrator.

Michael Whelan may also refer to:

 Michael Whelan (poet) (1858–1937), "the Poet of Renous"
 Michael Whelan (scientist) (born 1931), British scientist
 Mickey Whelan, Gaelic football player, selector, and manager
 Mick Whelan (born 1960), General Secretary since 2011 of ASLEF

See also
Michael Whalen (disambiguation)
Whelan (disambiguation)